The 1902 Syracuse Orangemen football team represented Syracuse University during the 1902 college football season. The head coach was Edwin Sweetland, coaching his third season with the Orangemen.

Schedule

References

Syracuse
Syracuse Orange football seasons
Syracuse Orangemen football